Widder (HSK 3) was an auxiliary cruiser (Hilfskreuzer) of Nazi Germany's Kriegsmarine that was used as a merchant raider in the Second World War. Her Kriegsmarine designation was Schiff 21, to the Royal Navy she was Raider D. The name Widder (Ram) represents the constellation Aries in German.

Early history
Built for HAPAG, the Hamburg America Line, at Howaldtswerke, Kiel, she was launched  in 1930 as the freighter Neumark. After an uneventful career she was requisitioned by the Kriegsmarine for use as a commerce raider. She was converted for this purpose by Blohm & Voss in late 1939, and commissioned as the raider Widder on 9 December of that year. She sailed on her first and only raiding voyage in May 1940.

Raider voyage
Widder sailed as part of the Kriegsmarine's first wave of commerce raiders, sailing on 6 May 1940 under the command of Korvettenkapitän (later Fregattenkapitän) Helmuth von Ruckteschell.

Leaving Germany on 6 May 1940, she made for Bergen, in Norway. On 13 May the Widder confronted the British submarine  on the surface, enjoining an exchange of gunfire which lasted for over an hour, with no hits for either side. After the engagement, the cruiser sought shelter in Sandsfjord. On 14 May she sailed to the open sea, crossing the Arctic Circle the next day. After refuelling from the auxiliary ship Nordmark, she slipped through the Denmark Strait. Over a 5½ month period she captured and sank ten ships, totalling .

The Widder was reported to have machine-gunned the crew of the SS Anglo Saxon in their life-boats; one jolly boat with seven crewmen got away. Over two months later, on 27 October, the last two survivors in the boat landed in the Bahamas after a 2,275 mile voyage. One of the two died when his new ship was torpedoed in 1941, the other survived the war and testified against von Ruckteschell, who was sentenced to seven years for his war crime.

Having completed her mission, she returned to occupied France on 31 October 1940.

Later history
Deemed unsuitable as a merchant raider due to persistent drive problems, Widder was re-christened Neumark, and used as a repair ship in Norway, playing a major role in repairing the battleship  in 1943/1944. After the war she was taken into British service as Ulysses, then sold back to Germany as Fechenheim in 1950 before being wrecked off Bergen in 1955. Her hull was scrapped shortly after.

She was one of only two German auxiliary cruisers to survive the war, after one 1940 cruise. Her captain, Helmuth von Ruckteschell, was one of only two German naval commanders convicted of war crimes at the end of the war.

Raiding career

References

External links
 Hilfskreuzer Widder

Ships built in Kiel
Ships built in Hamburg
Shipwrecks in the North Sea
World War II commerce raiders
World War II cruisers of Germany
1930 ships
Maritime incidents in 1955
Auxiliary cruisers of the Kriegsmarine
Ships sunk with no fatalities